Ernest Asi Afiesimama is a Nigerian environmental and climate scientist who has worked for the Nigerian Meteorological Agency and was a consultant in environmental and climate affairs at Stern Integrated Projects  He was also the Coordinator of Save Nigerian Environment Initiative. He currently works with the  World Meteorological Organization.

Background
Afiesimama was born in Ogoloma, Okrika, Rivers State. He attended the World Meteorological Organisation (WMO) Regional Training Centre (RTC) Lagos and obtained the Class III (Weather Analyst) and Class II (Weather Forecaster) Certificates with distinction. He completed the Aeronautical Meteorologist Course in 1988 at the Nigerian College of Aviation Technology in Zaria and later studied at the Federal University of Technology Akure. He holds a first class degree in atmospheric physics (meteorology) and Master of Sciences (Distinction) in hydrology and water resources. He obtained his Ph.D in climatology (climate dynamics) at the University of Lagos and has been in environmental consultancy for many years. He recently obtained a first class degree in Law from The University of Law, United Kingdom. He has an advanced diploma in electrical/electronic engineering and other postgraduate certificates in environmental and climate related fields.

Weatherman
He joined the then Department of Meteorological Services of the Federal Service and was a national TV weather presenter in 1997. He received an award for excellence in weather presentation. He was the head of international relations and protocols and also the general manager, numerical weather predictions (NWP) of the Nigerian Meteorological Agency (NiMet). He is currently the Programme Manager, Offices for Africa and Least Developed Countries at the World Meteorological Organisation in Geneva, Switzerland.

Afiesimama was a senior associate scientist of the International Centre for Theoretical Physics (Physics of Weather and Climate Group), Trieste, Italy from 2002 to 2014. He was the lead author of Nigeria's Second National Communication on the development of Climate Scenarios in Nigeria.

Later career
He was the managing director of Stern Integrated Projects. These projects are related to the environmental training and consulting, environmental impact assessments and auditing, environmental vulnerability, mitigation and adaptation due to climate variability and change. In addition, he was the national coordinator of the Save Nigerian Environment Initiative (SNEI)., a non-governmental, non-profit organization that strives to sensitize, educate and promote the protection, conservation and efficient use of the environment in a sustainable manner for socio-economic development.

He writes reports on environmental impact assessment, issues relating to socio-economic analyses on climate risks, mitigation options and adaptation strategies due to climate variability and change on local, national and international projects. He was a member of the African Monsoon Multidisciplinary Analyses (AMMA-2050), International Scientific Steering Committee (ISSC) in Europe  and the president of the scientific committee of AMMA in Africa.

He is a member of professional bodies including the Nigerian Hydrogeological Association, the American Meteorological Society and the American Geophysical Union.

References

People from Okrika
Scientists from Rivers State
Living people
Nigerian meteorologists
Federal University of Technology Akure alumni
University of Lagos alumni
Nigerian climatologists
Year of birth missing (living people)